Nguyên Lê (Vietnamese: Lê Thành Nguyên; born 14 January 1959) is a French jazz musician and composer of Vietnamese ancestry. His main instrument is guitar, and he also plays bass guitar and guitar synthesizer.

He has released albums as a leader and as a sideman. His 1996 album Tales from Viêt-Nam blends jazz and traditional Vietnamese music. Nguyên Lê has performed with Randy Brecker, Vince Mendoza, Eric Vloeimans, Carla Bley, Michel Portal, Renaud Garcia-Fons, Per Mathisen, Marc Johnson, Peter Erskine, Trilok Gurtu, Paolo Fresu and Dhafer Youssef.

In spring 2011 he released Songs of Freedom, an album with cover versions of pop hits from the 1970s.

Bands
Nguyên Lê Trio
Nguyên Lê: guitars, arrangements 
Michel Alibo: electric bass
Karim Ziad: drums, percussion
Nguyên Lê "Jimi's back"
Nguyên Lê: guitars, arrangements 
Himiko Paganotti: vocals
Romain Labaye: bass guitar
Gergő Borlai: drums
Nguyên Lê "Purple"
Nguyên Lê: guitars
Michel Alibo:bass guitar
Terri Lyne Carrington: drums, vocals
Aïda Khann: vocals
Corin Curschellas: vocals
Me'shell Ndegeocello: bass guitar
Karim Ziad: percussion
Bojan Zulfikarpasic: piano
Huong Thanh & Nguyên Lê - "Dragonfly"
Huong Thanh: vocals 
Nguyên Lê: guitars, arrangements
Hao Nhien: traditional instrument zither 
Dan Bau: flute, percussion
François Verly: percussion, synthesizer 
Michel Alibo: bass guitar
Joël Allouche: drums/percussion
Nguyên Lê Quartett:
Nguyen Le: guitars
Paul McCandless: saxophone, clarinet
Art Lande: piano
Jamey Haddad: percussion
ELB (Erskine - Lê - Benita)
Peter Erskine: drums
Nguyên Lê: guitars, guitar synthesizer
Michel Benita: double bass
Nguyên Lê "Songs of Freedom":
Nguyen Le: guitars, laptop
Himiko Paganotti: vocals
Illya Amar: vibes/electronics
Romain Labaye: bass, vocals
Stephane Galland/Gergo Borlai: drums
Nguyen Lê & the Dark Side Nine (Celebrating Dark Side of the Moon)
Nguyen Lê: guitars, electronics, arrangements 
Himiko Paganotti: vocals
Illya Amar: vibes & electronics
Gergo Borlai: drums
Romain Labaye: bass guitar
Stéphane Guillaume: tenor and soprano sax
Sylvain Gontard: trumpet
Celine Bonacina: baritone and alto sax
Daniel Zimmermann: trombone
Nguyên Lê Streams Quartet
Illya Amar: vibes & electronics
Chris Jennings: bass
John Hadfield: drums and percussion

Discography

As leader 
 1990: Miracles (Musidisc), with Art Lande, Marc Johnson and Peter Erskine
 1992: Zanzibar (Musidisc), with Paul McCandless, Joël Allouche
 1995: Million Waves (ACT), with Dieter Ilg and drummer Danny Gottlieb
 1996: Tales from Vietnam (ACT), with Huong Thanh, Hao Nhien, Paolo Fresu, Trilok Gurtu, Simon Spang-Hanssen, Michel Benita
 1997: Three Trios (ACT)
 1998: Maghreb & Friends (ACT)
 1999: Moon and Wind (ACT), with Huong Thanh
 2000: Bakida (ACT), with Renaud Garcia-Fons and Tino di Geraldo featuring Carles Benavent
 2002: Purple – Celebrating Jimi Hendrix (ACT)
 2005: Walking on the Tiger's Tail (ACT) with Paul McCandless, Art Lande and Jamey Haddad
 2006: Homescape (ACT), duos with Paolo Fresu and Dhafer Youssef
 2007: Fragile Beauty (ACT), with Huong Thanh
 2009: Saiyuki (ACT)
 2011: Songs of Freedom (ACT)
 2014: Celebrating Dark Side of the Moon (ACT)
 2017: Hà Nội Duo (ACT), featuring Ngo Hong Quang
 2019: Streams (ACT)

As sideman 
With Safy Boutella
 1992: Mejnoun (Indigo)

Within Uri Caine Ensamble
 2006: Uri Caine Ensemble Plays Mozart (Winter & Winter)
 2009: The Othello Syndrome (Winter & Winter)

Within ELB, including with Peter Erskine and Michel Benita
 2001: ELB (ACT)
 2008: Dream Flight (ACT), featuring Stéphane Guillaume

Within Andy Emler Mega Octet
 1992: Head Games (Label Bleu)

With Paolo Fresu
 1998: Angel (BMG France/RCA Victor)
 2012: Cinquant'Anni Suonati – 2 (Gruppo Editoriale L'Espresso S.p.A.)

With François Moutin and André Ceccarelli
 1993: Init (Phonogram), featuring Bob Berg

With Cæcilie Norby, Lars Danielsson, and Leszek Możdżer
 2013: Silent Ways (ACT)

With Romano/Sclavis/Texier + Enrico Rava, Bojan Z
 2012: 3+3 (Label Bleu)

Within Ultramarine
 1985: Programme Jungle (Bloomdido)
 1989: Dé (America)
 2007: E Si Mala (Universal Music France)

With Dhafer Youssef
 1999: Malak (Enja), including with Markus Stockhausen, Renaud Garcia-Fons, and Jatinder Thakur

With Tùng Dương
 2013: Độc đạo (Dihavina)

References

External links 

UNESCO International Jazz Day interview Nguyên Lê (English) 2012
"French-Vietnamese Guitarist Breaks Barriers : For Nguyen Le, More the Merrier", New York Times, January 17, 2001.
Nguyen Le, MySpace

20th-century guitarists
21st-century guitarists
French jazz guitarists
French male guitarists
1959 births
Living people
French people of Vietnamese descent
Vietnamese musicians
Musicians of Vietnamese descent
ACT Music artists
20th-century French male musicians
21st-century French male musicians
French male jazz musicians
Orchestre National de Jazz members